Prior to be Honorary Companions of Honour with Collar, they have been Honorary Companions of Honour :
 H.M. Queen Elizabeth II, K.U.O.M. 28.05.92
 H.E. Oscar Luigi Scalfaro, K.U.O.M. 11.10.93

N.B. The list can be updated with this page

 Egon Klepsch
 Mário Soares
 Angelo Sodano
 George Vasiliou
 Richard von Weizsäcker
 Ernst-Reinhard Beck

References

 
Malta-related lists